was a professional wrestling event produced by New Japan Pro-Wrestling (NJPW). It took place on January 4 in the Tokyo Dome. Toukon Shidou Chapter 1 was the fifteenth January 4 Tokyo Dome Show held by NJPW. The show drew 31,000 spectators. The main focus of the 11 match show was the IWGP championship defenses in the semi-main event and the main event. In the semi-main event Masahiro Chono and Hiroyoshi Tenzan successfully defended the IWGP Tag Team Championship against Shiro Koshinaka and Takao Omori; while the main event featured Brock Lesnar retaining the IWGP Heavyweight Championship against Shinsuke Nakamura. For only the second time in the history of the January 4 Tokyo Dome Shows, no title changed hands.

Production

Background
The January 4 Tokyo Dome Show is NJPW's biggest annual event and has been called "the largest professional wrestling show in the world outside of the United States" and the "Japanese equivalent to the Super Bowl".

Storylines
Toukon Shidou Chapter 1 featured professional wrestling matches that involved different wrestlers from pre-existing scripted feuds and storylines. Wrestlers portrayed villains, heroes, or less distinguishable characters in scripted events that built tension and culminated in a wrestling match or series of matches.

Results

References

External links
NJPW.co.jp 

2006 in professional wrestling
2006 in Tokyo
January 2006 events in Japan
January 4 Tokyo Dome Show